Larry Rosen may refer to:
Lawrence Rosen (attorney), lawyer, specialized in technology-related intellectual property issues
Larry Rosen (producer) (1940–2015), musician and record producer, GRP Records
Larry Rosen (executive) (born 1956), CEO of Harry Rosen Inc.
Larry Rosen (1936–2020), television producer and writer who produced The Partridge Family

See also 
Lawrence Rosen (disambiguation)